Lullington Church, also known as the Church of the Good Shepherd, on the South Downs at Lullington in East Sussex is one of several churches claimed to be the smallest church in England. It was built from the remains of the chancel of an earlier church that was destroyed by fire, generally believed to have occurred at the time of Oliver Cromwell. It measures a mere 16 feet (5 metres) square and seats 20 people.

The original church is believed to date from the late 12th or early 13th century and was built as a chapel in the parish of Alfriston, owned by Battle Abbey, and later became a separate parish. In 1927 the parishes of Alfriston and Lullington were merged. The original dedication of the church is unknown, and in 2000 the Bishop of Chichester dedicated the church to the Good Shepherd.

The church was the inspiration for Sea Power's song "The Smallest Church in Sussex", which featured as a b-side to "Remember Me" in 2003. The organ featured on that song comes from the harmonium inside the actual church.

See also
List of current places of worship in Wealden

References

External links
Information on 'A Church Near You' C of E site

Church of England church buildings in East Sussex